Hoogelande is a small hamlet in the Dutch province of Zeeland. It is located in the municipality of Veere, about 4 km northwest of Middelburg.

Hoogelande was a separate municipality until 1816, when it was annexed by Grijpskerke.

References

Populated places in Zeeland
Former municipalities of Zeeland
Veere